Gekko is a genus of lizards native to Southeast Asia. 

Gekko may also refer to:
 Gekko (optimization software)
 Gekko Records
 Gordon Gekko, a fictitious character from the movie Wall Street
 Gekko, a superhero from PJ Masks

Gekkō (月光) also means "moonlight" in Japanese:
 Gekko (microprocessor), the CPU of the GameCube
 A variant of the Japanese Nakajima J1N fighter of World War II
 Gekkō, a type of mechanized weapon in the Metal Gear game universe.
 The Gekko Observatory in Japan
 Gekko Moriah, an antagonist in the manga and anime One Piece
 Gekkou, video album by Gackt

See also
 Gecko (disambiguation)